Ceromitia trigoniferella is a species of moth of the  family Adelidae. It is known from South Africa.

References

Adelidae
Endemic moths of South Africa
Moths described in 1881